This is a list of franchise records for the Montreal Canadiens of the National Hockey League.

Team records

Single season

Single game

Streaks

Individual records

Career
Most goals for a player under the age of 21 in playoffs...

Season

Single game

¹ NHL record

² Minimum 70-game schedule

See also
List of Montreal Canadiens players
List of NHL statistical leaders
List of NHL players

Notes and references

 Source: NHL Official Guide & Record Book

Records
National Hockey League statistical records
records